Bessie Bell Collier Ellery (April 3, 1885 – April 4, 1969) was an American violinist. She was also original owner, with her husband William Ellery, of Dreamhome, a summer estate in Maine.

Early life 
Bessie Bell Collier was born in Cohasset, Massachusetts, the eldest of five children born to Edmund Pomeroy Collier and Ella Bell Sargent Collier. From ages 8 to 18, she studied violin with Franz Kneisel. She was already known for her musical skills and performing at concerts by age 10. As a young woman she played the violin at society events in Cohasset, with her sister Grace Anna playing piano.

Career 
Bessie Bell Collier was a violinist. She made her professional debut at Steinert Hall in Boston in 1905. She appeared as a soloist with the Boston Symphony, the New York Symphony, the St. Paul Symphony, and others. In 1910–1911 she was a soloist at Walter Damrosch's Philharmonic Concerts for Young People. "Miss Collier's ability does not lie in digital expertness, nor in a precise articulation of the bow," commented The Boston Globe in 1912. "Her playing indicates a refined mind, sensibility to emotion, and a respect for her instrument as a medium for interpretation rather than of mere display."

In 1913 Collier and singer Marie Sundelius gave a benefit concert to raise funds for the American Red Cross for flood victims. She gave benefit concerts during World War I for the French Wounded Fund. She also funded a scholarship for women students of her old teacher, Franz Kneisel, when he taught at Kneisel Hall in Blue Hill, Maine.

The Ellerys built Dreamhome, a summer estate in Woodstock, Maine, in 1916. They wrote about their gardens for botanical publications.

Personal life 
Bessie Bell Collier married Boston wool merchant William Ellery in 1914, in Boston. She was widowed when William died in 1961. She died in 1969, aged 84 years, in Massachusetts.

References

External links 
 

1885 births
1969 deaths
American classical violinists
20th-century classical violinists
Women classical violinists
People from Cohasset, Massachusetts
People from Woodstock, Maine